WELY (1450 AM) and WELY-FM (94.5 FM) are a pair of simulcast radio stations based in the small tourist destination town of Ely, Minnesota, United States. WELY serves the Boundary Waters Canoe Area and Surrounding towns and areas of northeastern Minnesota.

WELY (AM) was founded in 1954. The "front porch" studio is downtown, on E. Chapman Street. Both stations share a transmitter site south of town.

History

WELY (AM)
WELY signed on the air on October 2, 1954. WELY's first owner was Charles B. Pearson, who sold the station to WELY Corporation in 1959, and it would be operated as a side business by Vincent T. Hallett for the next 17 years. WELY changed hands again in 1963 when WELY Corporation sold the station to North Central Video, which sold the station to Northern Lakes Corporation in 1967. WELY's next owner would come in 1976, when the Northern Lakes Corporation sold it to BJL Broadcasting Corporation. In 1987, WELY suspended operations for a time due to financial difficulty, which was featured as a news story on KSTP-TV.

WELY-FM
WELY-FM signed on the air on July 25, 1992. The original callsign was KQEK, as issued on January 17, 1992, but was changed to WELY-FM on June 5, 1992.

As a pair
WELY was owned by retired CBS broadcaster Charles Kuralt from 1995 until his death on July 4, 1997. In 1999, WELY-AM-FM transferred from the estate of Suzanna Baird Kuralt to her estate's executors, Susan Bowers & Lisa Bowers White, who sold the stations to Alice L. Hill & Janice Nagel Erickson, a Twin Cities transplant. In 2005, it was purchased by the Bois Forte Band of Chippewa. The stations went silent on Thursday, December 1 2022 as the transition began to the new owner Zoe Communications, Inc. of Shell Lake, Wis. The company owns 17 radio stations, including numerous outlets in smaller markets similar to Ely. WELY plans to return to the air when the FCC grants the transfer which normally takes about 90 days.

See also
List of community radio stations in the United States

References

External links 

Community radio stations in the United States
Radio stations in Minnesota
St. Louis County, Minnesota
Radio stations established in 1954
1954 establishments in Minnesota